This article provides a list of wars occurring between 1800 and 1899. Conflicts of this era include the Napoleonic Wars in Europe, the American Civil War in North America, the Taiping Rebellion in Asia, the Paraguayan War in South America, the Zulu War in Africa, and the Australian frontier wars in Oceania.

1800–1810

1810–1819

1820–1829

1830–1839

1840–1849

1850–1859

1860–1869

1870–1879

1880–1889

1890–1899

Notes

References

1800-1899
19th-century conflicts
19th century-related lists